Trinity Episcopal School is a liberal arts high school located in Richmond, Virginia. Trinity started as a small independent school in 1972.

Athletics
Trinity is a member of the Virginia Preparatory League for boys sports and the League of Independent Schools for girls sports.

Notes

High schools in Richmond, Virginia
Private high schools in Virginia
Episcopal schools in Virginia
International Baccalaureate schools in Virginia
1972 establishments in Virginia
Educational institutions established in 1972